Natella Savelievna Boltyanskaya (born 20 May 1965, Moscow) is a Russian journalist, singer-songwriter, poet and ex-radio host on Echo of Moscow.

She is author and performer of songs mostly on her own poetry. She published four music albums, Warning (2001), Restoration (2003), Sleepers (2005), and Shepherd's Song (2009). She is author of many political songs, such as those dedicated to Nikita Khrushchev, Solomon Mikhoels, Anna Politkovskaya and song Gaechka ("Nut") regarded as criticism of Vladimir Putin

From 1993 to 2022, Boltyanskaya daily hosted several programs at Echo of Moscow, including program Bard about Russian author song, history program In the name of Stalin, and political/news programs People are against and Special opinion. Since 1993, she works as director of the Creative Association of Russian bards.

She also hosted programs on NTV (Russia), Echo TV Russia, Russian TNT, TV Tsentr and other TV channels. She produced the documentary Parallels, Events, People about the 2011–13 Russian protests and Soviet dissident movement.

References

External links
Her official website
Her concert in club Hyperion
Facebook page
Her site at Echo of Moscow
Her site on "Daily Journal" (Russian)
Links to her music albums
Notes from Echo of Moscow (bards) by Natella Boltyanskaya

Russian bards
Russian women poets
Russian women journalists
Russian television personalities
Echo of Moscow radio presenters
Living people
1965 births
Soviet women singer-songwriters
Soviet singer-songwriters
Russian women singer-songwriters
Musicians from Moscow
Russian women film directors
20th-century Russian women singers
20th-century Russian singers